Prince Anton of Hohenzollern-Sigmaringen (7 October 1841 – 6 August 1866) was a German prince and soldier. He was a member of the Princely House of Hohenzollern-Sigmaringen.  During the Austro-Prussian War, while serving with the First Foot Guards, Prince Anton was mortally wounded at Königgrätz and died 33 days later of his wounds.

Family
His father was Charles Anthony, Prince of Hohenzollern, and his mother was Princess Josephine of Baden, daughter of Grand Duke Charles of Baden.  Anton had several siblings, including:

Leopold (1835–1905)
Stephanie (1837–1859)
Karl (1839–1914)
Friedrich (1843–1904)
Maria Luise (1845–1912)

He was very close to his brother, Prince Frederick of Hohenzollern-Sigmaringen.

Ancestry

1841 births
1866 deaths
Princes of Hohenzollern-Sigmaringen
Sons of monarchs